Najib ad-Din Abu Hamid Muhammad ibn Ali ibn Umar Samarqandi was a 13th-century Persian physician from Samarqand.

Samarqandi died during the Mongol attack on Herat, in Afghanistan, in 1222CE. He was a prolific medical writer and expositor of medical ideas, though few details are known of his life.

His most famous book was The Book of Causes and Symptoms, a comprehensive manual of therapeutics and pathology. The treatises were widely read and often commentaries were written on them.

See also

List of Iranian scientists

Sources

For his life and writings, see:

 A. Z. Iskandar, "A Study of al-Samarqandi's Medical Writings", Le Muséon, vol. 85 (1972), pp 451–479; DSB vol. 12, pp 90–91.
 Manfred Ullmann, Die Medizin im Islam, Handbuch der Orientalistik, Abteilung I, Ergänzungsband vi, Abschnitt 1 (Leiden: E.J. Brill, 1970), p. 170.
 Juliane Müller, Nahrungsmittel in der arabischen Medizin
Das Kitāb al-Aġḏiya wa-l-ašriba des Naǧīb ad-Dīn as-Samarqandī. Brill, 2017. Critical edition and German translation.

External links

1222 deaths
Year of birth unknown
13th-century Iranian physicians
People from Samarkand